The Tivoli Hollow Railroad was chartered in 1893. It was completed  in the Tivoli Hollow section of the City of Albany, New York prior to 1903 (exact date not known). It was merged into New York Central and Hudson River Railroad in 1913.

See also
Tivoli Nature Preserve

References

 

Defunct New York (state) railroads
Predecessors of the New York Central Railroad
Transportation in Albany, New York
Railway companies established in 1893
Railway companies disestablished in 1913
1893 establishments in New York (state)
1913 disestablishments in New York (state)